Danny George Taylor (born 1 September 1991) is an English footballer, who plays for Airbus UK Broughton.

Playing career
Taylor began his career at Shrewsbury Town. He made his home debut as an 18th minute substitute for Dean Holden in a 2–1 victory over Dagenham & Redbridge at the New Meadow on 23 January 2010. Seven days later he won his second start making this his full home debut in the 1–0 home defeat by Accrington Stanley. The teenager was praised for his two performances. At the end of the season he signed his first professional contract. He was released on 23 May 2011.

In July 2011 he joined Airbus UK where he played until he left the club by mutual consent at the end of September 2012.

The following month he joined Colwyn Bay.

Taylor joined Conference National club Chester on 2 June 2014. He re-joined Colwyn Bay in November.

References

External links
Profile at the Official Shrewsbury Town site

Living people
English footballers
Association football defenders
Shrewsbury Town F.C. players
Chester F.C. players
English Football League players
1991 births
Airbus UK Broughton F.C. players
Cymru Premier players
Colwyn Bay F.C. players
Llandudno F.C. players
Sportspeople from Chester